Tamanyan Street (Tamanyan poghots) is a pedestrian street in Yerevan, Armenia. It is located in the central Kentron district and links the Yerevan Cascade at the north with the Moscow street at the south. It is named after the main architect of Yerevan Alexander Tamanian. Tamanian's statue stands at the entrance to the street since 1974.

The Cafesjian Sculpture Garden of the Cafesjian Museum of Art is located along the street. The street ends with the staircase of the cascade complex.

The sculpture garden of the street is home to works of many influential artists including Fernando Botero's Cat, Roman warrior, and Woman Smoking a Cigarette.

The Museum of Russian Art is also located on the Tamanyan Street.

Several types of coffee shops, bars, restaurants, and pubs are found at the sidewalks of the street.

Gallery

References

Transport in Yerevan
Roads in Armenia
Pedestrian streets in Armenia
Streets in Yerevan